Mark Williams Ardington is a British visual effects artist.

Ardington received the 2015 Academy Award for his work on the film Ex Machina in the category of Best Visual Effects. He shared the award with Andrew Whitehurst, Paul Norris, and Sara Bennett.

References

External links

http://www.plumanimation.com/html/plum_frameset.htm website of his work\

Living people
Year of birth missing (living people)
Place of birth missing (living people)
Special effects people
Best Visual Effects Academy Award winners